Sewell is both a surname and a given name, derived from the Middle English personal names  Sewal (Siwal) or Sewald (Siwald). As a toponymic surname, it may have originally referred to people of Sewell, Bedfordshire or other places named Sewell, Showell, or Seawell.

Notable people with the given name "Sewell" include
Sewell Avery (1874–1960), American businessman 
Sewell Chan (born 1977), American journalist
Sewell Collins (1876–1934), American playwright
Sewell Foster (1792–1868), Canadian physician
Sewell Jones (1897–1981), American football coach
Sewell Moody (1834–1875), American merchant
Sewell A. Peterson (1850–1915), American politician
Sewell Sillman (1924–1992), American painter
Sewell Stokes (1902–1979), British writer and broadcaster

Notable people with the surname "Sewell" include

A
A. E. Sewell (1872–1946), English architect
Albert Sewell (1927–2018), English statistician
Alice Maud Sewell (1881–1971), Australian activist
Almondo Sewell (born 1987), American football player
Amanda Brewster Sewell (1859–1926), American painter
Amy Sewell (born 1963), American author
Andy Sewell (born 1978), British photographer
Anna Sewell (1820–1878), British writer
Anthony Sewell (born 1962), American motocross racer
Arthur Sewell (disambiguation), multiple people

B
Bill Sewell (disambiguation), multiple people
Blanche Sewell (1898–1949), American film editor
Brad Sewell (born 1984), Australian rules footballer
Brian Sewell (1931–2015), English art critic
Briana Sewell (born 1990), American politician
Brocard Sewell (1912–2000), British monk
Bruce Sewell (born 1957/1958), American corporate executive

C
Cecil Sewell (1895–1918), British Army lieutenant
Cissie Sewell (1893–??), American educator
Conrad Sewell (born 1988), Australian singer
Cyril Sewell (1874–1951), South African-English cricketer

D
Daisy Elizabeth McQuigg Sewell (1876–1944), American religious leader
Damani Sewell (born 1994), Jamaican cricketer
Danny Sewell (1930–2001), British boxer
David Sewell (born 1977), New Zealand cricketer
Dean Sewell (born 1972), Jamaican footballer
Dean Sewell (photographer) (born 1972), Australian photographer
Doug Sewell (1929–2017), English golfer

E
E. G. Sewell (1874–1940), American politician
E. H. D. Sewell (1872–1947), English cricketer
Elizabeth Sewell (disambiguation), multiple people
Elyse Sewell (born 1982), American fashion model
Emmer Sewell (born 1934), American artist

F
Francis Hill Sewell (1815–1862), English clergyman
Frederick Sewell (1881–1964), English cricketer

G
Geoff Sewell (born 1972), New Zealand tenor
George Sewell (disambiguation), multiple people
Gillian Sewell (born 1972), Irish-Canadian field hockey player
Granville Sewell, American mathematician
Greg Sewell (born 1933), Australian rules footballer

H
Harley Sewell (1931–2011), American football player
Harry Sewell (1885–1953), British steeple chaser
Hazel Sewell (1898–1975), American animator
Helen Sewell (1896–1957), American illustrator
Henry Sewell (1807–1879), New Zealand politician
Henry Sewell (cricketer) (born 1935), Jamaican cricketer
Horace Sewell (1881–1953), British army officer

I
Ike Sewell (1903–1990), American entrepreneur

J
Jack Sewell (1913–2000), English cricketer
Jack Sewell (rugby league) (1926–1955), English rugby league footballer
Jackie Sewell (1927–2016), English footballer
Jameel Sewell (born 1987), American football player
James Sewell (disambiguation), multiple people
Jim Sewell (born 1956), Australian rules footballer
Joe Sewell (1898–1990), American baseball player
John Sewell (disambiguation), multiple people
Jonathan Sewell (1766–1839), Canadian politician
Joseph Sewell, English footballer
Josh Sewell (born 1981), American football player

K
Karen Sewell (born 1944/1945), New Zealand educator
Keechant Sewell (born 1972), American police officer

L
Larry Sewell (born 1948), New Zealand cricketer
LaVerne Sewell (1888–1906), American jockey
Leo Sewell (born 1945), American visual artist
Luke Sewell (1901–1987), American baseball player

M
Margaret Sewell (1852–1937), English educator
Marvin Sewell, American guitarist
Mary A. Sewell (born 1963), New Zealand marine biologist
Mary Wright Sewell (1797–1884), British author
Matt Sewell (born 1990), Canadian football player
Morley Sewell (born 1932), British veterinarian

N
Nephi Sewell (born 1998), American football player
Nicole Sewell (born 1981), Australian tennis player
Noah Sewell (born 2001), American football player

P
Penei Sewell (born 2000), American football player

R
R. B. Seymour Sewell (1880–1964), British doctor
Richard Clarke Sewell (1803–1864), English lawyer
Rip Sewell (1907–1989), American baseball player
Robert Sewell (disambiguation), multiple people
Robin Sewell (born 1979), South African dancer
Ronnie Sewell (1890–1945), English footballer
Rufus Sewell (born 1967), English actor

S
Shane Sewell (born 1972), Canadian professional wrestler
Sicily Sewell (born 1985), American actress
Stephen Sewell (disambiguation), multiple people
Steve Sewell (born 1963), American football player

T
Terri Sewell (born 1965), American politician
Thomas Sewell (disambiguation), multiple people
Timothy Toyne Sewell (born 1941), British army officer
Tommy Sewell (1906–1956), American baseball player
Tony Sewell (born 1959), British educator

V
Valentine Sewell (1910–1978), English cricketer
Vernon Sewell (1903–2001), British film director

W
William Sewell (disambiguation), multiple people

See also
Sewell (disambiguation), a disambiguation page for "Sewell"
Attorney General Sewell (disambiguation), a disambiguation page for Attorney Generals surnamed "Sewell"
General Sewell (disambiguation), a disambiguation page for Generals surnamed "Sewell"

References

English-language surnames
English toponymic surnames